Blaufelden is a municipality in the district of Schwäbisch Hall in Baden-Württemberg in Germany.

The settlement is first mentioned in a document from 1157.  The Reformation was introduced to Blaufelden in 1526 and it has been Lutheran ever since.

References

Schwäbisch Hall (district)